The 1978 Prague Skate was held in November 1978. Medals were awarded in the disciplines of men's singles, ladies' singles, pair skating, and ice dancing.

Men

Ladies

Pairs

Ice dancing

References
Rude Pravo Archiv,13.11.1978, Page 8

Prague Skate
Prague Skate